Pascal Vanderveeren (born 16 March 1946) is a Belgian lawyer.  He was the president of the International Criminal Bar (the bar association of the International Criminal Court) during 2007–2010.  He was president of the bar in Belgium during 1998–2000.  He also founded his own law firm, Vanderveeren & Associes, in Brussels, which specializes in business crime.

Vanderveeren received his Dr. Jur. from the University of Louvain in 1968, and Lic. Econ. Law from the Université libre de Bruxelles in 1969.  He is married to Ana da Silveira.

References
LexisNexis
Chambers
Who's Who Legal
CV (in French)

External links
International Criminal Bar

1946 births
Living people
20th-century Belgian lawyers
Free University of Brussels (1834–1969) alumni
Université catholique de Louvain alumni
21st-century Belgian lawyers